Andy Mullins may refer to:

 Andy Mullins (actor)
 Andy Mullins (rugby union)
 Andy P. Mullins, American educator